Hector Richard "Hec" Yeomans, MM (17 February 1895 – 11 September 1968) was an Australian rules footballer who played with St Kilda and Hawthorn in the Victorian Football League (VFL).

Early life
Yeomans was born in Albert Park, Melbourne, in 1895, the only child of Richard Eli Yeomans and Norah Teresa Cameron.

War service
Yeomans enlisted to fight in World War I in January 1916 and fought in France, receiving the Military Medal for his actions in the Battle of Mont Saint-Quentin in September 1918.

Football
Yeomans played two senior games for St Kilda in the 1920 VFL season before leaving to join Hawthorn, then in the Victorian Football Association. 

He was an immediate success at Hawthorn, establishing himself as one of the leading rovers in the Victorian Football Association at that time. He continued to play for Hawthorn when they joined the VFL in 1925 and was their second highest goal-kicker for the year.

After two years as captain coach of the Tooronga junior side, Yeomans joined Brunswick for the 1928 VFA season, but played only a handful of games.

Death
Hec Yeomans died in 1968 and is buried at Melbourne General Cemetery.

References

External links

1895 births
1968 deaths
Australian military personnel of World War I
Australian recipients of the Military Medal
Australian rules footballers from Melbourne
St Kilda Football Club players
Hawthorn Football Club (VFA) players
Hawthorn Football Club players
Brunswick Football Club players
People from Albert Park, Victoria
Military personnel from Melbourne